Akhtarin Subdistrict is the easternmost subdistrict of Azaz District in the northern Aleppo Governorate of northern Syria, on the border with Turkey. Its administrative centre and largest town is Akhtarin. Its town of Dabiq is notable for the battle of Marj Dabiq in 1516, and its place in Islamic eschatology. Neighbouring subdistricts are Sawran Subdistrict (northwest) and Mare' Subdistrict (southwest), both in Azaz District, as well as al-Rai Subdistrict (northeast) and al-Bab Subdistrict (southeast), both belonging to al-Bab District. To the north is the Kilis Province of Turkey.

At the 2004 census, the subdistrict had a population of 39,385.

Cities, towns and villages

References 

Azaz District
Akhtarin